Fernando Arcega Aperte (born 3 September 1960 in Ainzón, Zaragoza, Aragón) is a retired basketball player from Spain. He used to play as forward.

Arcega earned 121 caps for the Spain national basketball team and played at three Olympic Games. He was silver medallist for Spain in 1984 at Olympic Games and in 1983 at Eurobasket, and bronze medalist in 1991 at Eurobasket. Arcega won two Spanish Cups (1984, 1989) playing for CB Zaragoza (as CAI Zaragoza).

Personal life 
Two of his brothers, José and Joaquín, also played professional basketball in Spain. Jose did also represent Spain in the Olympics.

Arcega's nephew, J. J. Arcega-Whiteside, currently plays for Philadelphia Eagles.

References 

basketpedya.com
Spanish Olympic Committee

1960 births
Living people
Basketball players at the 1984 Summer Olympics
Basketball players at the 1988 Summer Olympics
Liga ACB players
Medalists at the 1984 Summer Olympics
Olympic basketball players of Spain
Olympic silver medalists for Spain
Olympic medalists in basketball
Spanish men's basketball players
CB Zaragoza players
Forwards (basketball)
1986 FIBA World Championship players